Aviva is a  length motor yacht. Drafted as Aviva III, it is the third super yacht named Aviva built for Bahamas-based British businessman Joe Lewis. Launched in 2007 by Lemwerder-based German builder Abeking & Rasmussen, they undertook the overall design and interior details, while Reymond Langton were responsible for external styling.

Aviva acts as Lewis's personal mobile office, housing his personal art collection, Lewis has been known to live on Aviva for months at a time. Capable of housing up to 16 guests, the yacht has been refitted on at least two occasions since her 2007 launch.

In 2017, the same yard launched a new Aviva for Lewis, with a hull length of 98metres.

See also
List of motor yachts by length
Super yacht

References

External links

Aviva @ SuperYachts.com
Aviva @ SuperYachtTimes.com

Motor yachts
Ships built in Germany
2007 ships